The Deutschsprachige Konferenz der Pfadfinderverbände (DSK) (German-speaking Conference of Scout Associations) is the international community of Scouting organizations in the German-speaking countries, an umbrella of Central European organizations within the World Organization of the Scout Movement or World Association of Girl Guides and Girl Scouts, including Austria, Luxembourg, Switzerland, France (Alsace), South Tyrol (Italy), the German-speaking Community of Belgium, and Liechtenstein. Its members are internationally recognized German Scouting associations and the minority German-speaking Scouting associations.

The DSK was started as a language based meeting but has developed to a common platform whose aims are the informal cooperation of WOSM/WAGGGS-organizations, including 11 participant countries as of 2001. These include some clearly non-German language organizations from the Czech Republic, Poland, and Slovenia.,

History
Conferences have been held at:

1969: Überlingen (1st)
1972: Lengenfelden (2nd)
1973: Vaduz
1986: Reichenau Island
1996 (?): Luxembourg
2000: Adelboden
2001: Rieneck
2004: Burg-Reuland, Belgium
2005: Ermelo
2006: Goldrain, Südtirol
2007: Schaan
2008: Budapest
2009: Kandersteg
2010: Warsaw
2011: Germany
2019: Budapest

References

External links 

Scouting and Guiding in Germany
International Scouting organizations
German language
Youth organizations established in 1969